SM UC-90 was a German Type UC III minelaying submarine or U-boat in the German Imperial Navy during World War I. Completed in mid-1918, she saw no action during the war and was transferred to the Imperial Japanese Navy afterwards. The submarine briefly served in the IJN during 1920–1921 before she was partially dismantled and ultimately scrapped in 1926.

Design
A German Type UC III submarine, UC-90 had a displacement of  when at the surface and  while submerged. The submarine was powered by two six-cylinder four-stroke diesel engines each producing  (a total of ), two electric motors producing , and two propeller shafts.

UC-90 was fitted with six  mine tubes, fourteen UC 200 mines, three  torpedo tubes (one on the stern and two on the bow), seven torpedoes, and one  SK L/45 or  Uk L/30 deck gun . Her complement was twenty-six crew members.

Construction and career
The U-boat was ordered on 12 January 1916 and was launched on 19 January 1918. She was commissioned into the German Imperial Navy on 15 July 1918 as SM UC-90. As with the rest of the completed UC III boats, UC-90 conducted no war patrols and sank no ships. She was surrendered to Japan on 1 December 1918. The U-boat was renamed O-4 for Japanese service from 1920 to 1921. In 1921 O-4 was partially dismantled at the Kure Navy Yard. Between 1924 and 1926, the hulk of O-4 was used as an antisubmarine warfare target before being sold for scrap.

References

Notes

Citations

Bibliography

 
 

German Type UC III submarines
Ships built in Hamburg
1918 ships
U-boats commissioned in 1918
World War I submarines of Germany
German Type UC III submarines of the Imperial Japanese Navy
World War I minelayers of Germany